Asian Express Airline was a Tajikistani charter airline based in Dushanbe.

History

The airline began operations in 2011.

Destinations 
The carrier operated both domestic and international services from Dushanbe International Airport; as of August 2015, all of its international routes were flights solely to and from airports in Russia.

Kaluga - Grabtsevo Airport
Mineralnye Vody - Mineralnye Vody Airport
Nizhny Novgorod - Nizhny Novgorod Airport
Volgograd - Volgograd Airport

Dushanbe - Dushanbe Airport Hub
Khujand - Khujand Airport
Kulob - Kulob

Fleet 
The Asian Express Airline consisted of the following aircraftas of August 2015:

References

External links

Defunct airlines of Tajikistan
Airlines established in 2011
2011 establishments in Tajikistan